Hubris is a solo album by American jazz pianist and composer Richard Beirach recorded in 1977 and released on the ECM label.

Reception
The Allmusic review by Stephen Cook awarded the album 3 stars stating "Beirach showed off his Bill Evans-tinged style and revealed his own brand of soft melancholy to the jazz audience. This solo date from 1977 proves the point with nine meditative pieces, all couched in ECM's patented spacious sound. While not on the same intensity level of Keith Jarrett's work or as subtle as Evans' prime recordings, Beirach's playing here still delivers its own dreamy rewards".

Track listing
All compositions by Richard Beirach.

 "Sunday Song" - 5:26
 "Leaving" - 5:20  
 "Koan" - 1:14
 "Osiris" - 3:37
 "Future Memory" - 4:52
 "Hubris" - 6:04
 "Rectilinear" - 2:16
 "The Pearl" - 5:26
 "Invisible Corridor / Sunday Song - Monday" - 5:16

Personnel
Richard Beirach - piano

References

1978 albums
Albums produced by Manfred Eicher
ECM Records albums
Instrumental albums
Richie Beirach albums
Solo piano jazz albums